Aïn Maabed is a town and commune in Djelfa Province, Algeria. According to the 1998 census it has a population of 13,183. Aïn Maabed lies on the N1 Trans-Saharan highway to the north by road from the provincial capital of Djelfa. Further north along the highway is the town of Hassi Bahbah.

References

Communes of Djelfa Province